Ronald Paul Wolfley "Se'eh"" (born October 14, 1962) is an American former professional football player who was a fullback in the National Football League (NFL) for the St. Louis/Arizona Cardinals from 1985 through 1991. Wolfley was selected four times to the Pro Bowl as a special teams captain.

Wolfley played collegiately for the West Virginia Mountaineers.

, Wolfley co-hosts a midday sports talk show on Arizona Sports 98.7 FM in Phoenix, Arizona with Luke Lapinski entitled, Luke and Wolf.  Teamed with play-by-play announcer Dave Pasch, Wolfley also serves as the Arizona Cardinals' color analyst on the Arizona Cardinals Radio Network.

Wolfley is the younger brother of former offensive lineman Craig Wolfley, formerly of the Pittsburgh Steelers and Minnesota Vikings.

Collegiate career
Wolfley arrived at West Virginia in 1981. His freshman year, he saw little action. He only rushed for 13 yards on the season.

As a sophomore in 1982, Wolfley started at fullback, blocking for starting running back Curlin Beck. He also rushed for 355 yards and two touchdowns of his own, good enough to be second on the team, behind Beck.

As a junior in 1983, Wolfley again started at fullback, blocking for running back Tom Gray. Wolfley had a career-high 485 yards rushing and four touchdowns on 122 carries.

In 1984, his final season as a Mountaineer, Wolfley assumed the role of starting running back, amassing 475 total yards and four touchdowns.

Professional career
Wolfley was selected in the fourth round of the 1985 NFL Draft by the St. Louis Cardinals. During his seven seasons as a Cardinal (from which the team moved from St. Louis to Phoenix), he totaled 252 yards and two scores. Wolfley was known for his fearless special teams play that allowed him to compete in four straight Pro Bowls from 1986 through 1989.

In 1992, Wolfley joined the Cleveland Browns, where he played for two seasons.  In 1995, he joined the St. Louis Rams for his final professional season.

Wolfley is the only player to have played in St. Louis for both the Cardinals and the Rams, earning him the moniker "America's Fullback."

References

External links
 NFL Network Interview
 Doug & Wolf Show on KTAR Sports
 

1962 births
Living people
American football running backs
Arizona Cardinals announcers
Cleveland Browns players
National Conference Pro Bowl players
National Football League announcers
Phoenix Cardinals players
Players of American football from New York (state)
St. Louis Cardinals (football) players
St. Louis Rams players
West Virginia Mountaineers football players
People from Erie County, New York
Ed Block Courage Award recipients